The Duguwa dynasty, or Dougouwa (700–1086), is the line of kings (mai) of the Kanem Empire prior to the rise of the Islamic Seyfawa dynasty in 1086. 

According to the Girgam, the Duguwa kings were the kings of Kanem whose dynastic name is derived from Duku, the third king of the Duguwa. Comparisons with accounts from Arab geographers show that the Duguwa were the king of the ruling class called Zaghawa. Up to recently historians believed that the Duguwa kings mentioned in the Girgam ruled in Kanem just before the first Muslim kings. 

Richmond Palmer states, "To all intents and purposes both Saif ibn Dthi Yazan and his son Ibrahim are a myth.  The first Mai of Kanem was 'Mai Dugu Bremmi,' who succeeded because he was the 'dugu' (tegasi) or son of the chief's daughter or sister..."  "The name dugu means strictly that he was the son of the daughter or a Mai, or Chief, i.e. the person the Tuareg call tegasi, or heir."  "Descent among the Maghumi, as among the Tuareg, passed to the son of a sister of the deceased king, called among the Tuareg, the tegasi or heir..."  "The legendary eponymous ancestor of the Saifawa, as the Maghumi are called, only became in Muslim times Saif, the 'lion of Yaman'."

One historian suggested that all the Duguwa kings except one were ancient Near Eastern rulers. Their names and titles bear witness of the founding of Kanem by refugees from the Assyrian Empire c. 600 BCE. This hypothesis is, however, not widely accepted.

Table of Duguwa kings

References

Literature
 Dierk Lange: The founding of Kanem by Assyrian Refugees ca. 600 BCE: Documentary, Linguistic, and Archaeological Evidence, Boston, Working Papers in African Studies N° 265, 2011.
 Abdullahi Smith: The early states of the Central Sudan, in: J. Ajayi and M. Crowder (ed.), History of West Africa, vol. I, 1st ed., London, 1971, 158–183.
 Yves Urvoy: L'empire du Bornou, Paris 1949.

See also
 Sayfawa dynasty
 Kanem Empire

Kanem Empire